New York Scene is a live album by drummer Art Blakey and The Jazz Messengers recorded in New York City in 1984 and released on the Concord Jazz label.

Reception

Scott Yanow of Allmusic called it "a fine set of hard bop".

This recording won the 1984 Grammy Award for Best Jazz Recording, Group

Track listing 
 "Oh, By The Way" (Terence Blanchard) – 10:06   
 "Ballad Medley: My One and Only Love/It's Easy to Remember/Who Cares?" (Guy Wood, Robert Mellin/Richard Rodgers, Lorenz Hart/George Gershwin, Ira Gershwin) – 7:23   
 "Controversy" (Donald Harrison) – 5:24   
 "Tenderly" (Walter Gross, Jack Lawrence) – 11:12   
 "Falafel" (Mulgrew Miller) – 9:54

Personnel 
Art Blakey – drums
Terence Blanchard – trumpet
Donald Harrison – alto saxophone
Jean Toussaint – tenor saxophone
Mulgrew Miller – piano
Lonnie Plaxico – bass

References 

Art Blakey live albums
The Jazz Messengers live albums
1984 live albums
Concord Records live albums
Grammy Award for Best Jazz Instrumental Album